Vasily Sergeyevich Smirnov (born December 20, 1914, O.S./January 2, 1915, N.S. in Petrograd; died March 5, 1973, in Leningrad) was a Soviet metallurgist and a corresponding member of the Soviet Academy of Sciences (since 1960). He made notable contributions to understanding the plastic deformation process.

1915 births
1973 deaths
Corresponding Members of the USSR Academy of Sciences
Soviet metallurgists